The Fox River is a river in Cochrane District in Northeastern Ontario, Canada. It is in the James Bay drainage basin and is a right tributary of the Kabinakagami River.

Course
The river begins at Fox Lake in geographic Bannerman Township, and flows north through Little Grassy Lake and Bannerman Lake, then continues north out of the township. It turns west and then northwest, and reaches its mouth at the Kabinakagami River. The Kabinakagami River flows via the Kenogami River and the Albany River to James Bay.

See also
List of rivers of Ontario

References

Sources

Rivers of Cochrane District